Madhupur Shahid Smrity Higher Secondary School, also known as Madhupur Shahid Smrity School & College, is a non-government educational institution in Madhupur Upazila, Tangail, Dhaka, Bangladesh, established in 1972. The school offers education for students ranging from six to Higher Secondary School Certificate with over 2500 students. Although it was set up for students of surrounding areas, students now come from most parts of Bangladesh. The school is under the direct control of the Ministry of Education.

History
Al-Haj Nur Rahman, a native-born son of Tangail, founded the school in 1972. The school opened its college section in 1995–96; and first participated in the HSC examination in 1997. Madhupur Shahid Smrity Higher Secondary School is especially devoted to education in areas that contribute to or prosper in science and technology. Madhupur Shahid Smrity Higher Secondary School has 2491 students, and 52 teachers.

Location
The school is in Madhupur Upazila, 45 km from Tangail, Mymensingh and Jamalpur district headquarters and 135 km from Dhaka city. The school is on the Bangshi River.

Publications
The magazine of Madhupur Shahid Smrity Higher Secondary School is named Jagaran, which means Awakening. The school publishes it annually with stories, articles, poems and writings from students, teachers and associate people. It also carries the results of the students in public examinations. It is published in Bengali.

Awards
The school was 9th among the top ten colleges (2003), and won the Presidential award for the best college of the year 2004.

Gallery

See also
 Alokdia High School
 Madhupur Rani Bhabani High School
 Madhupur College

References

Schools in Tangail District
Colleges in Tangail District
Education in Tangail